The 1979 Swiss Indoors was a men's tennis tournament played on indoor hard courts at the St. Jakobshalle in Basel, Switzerland that was part of the 1979 Colgate-Palmolive Grand Prix. It was the 11th edition of the tournament and was held from 15 October through 21 October 1979. Third-seeded Brian Gottfried won the singles title.

Finals

Singles
 Brian Gottfried defeated  Johan Kriek 7–5, 6–1, 4–6, 6–3
 It was Gottfried's 2nd singles title of the year and the 17th of his career.

Doubles
 Frew McMillan /  Bob Hewitt defeated  Brian Gottfried /  Raúl Ramírez 6–3, 6–4

References

External links
 Official website 
 ITF tournament edition details

Swiss Indoors
Swiss Indoors
indoor